Clanculus bronni is a species of sea snail, a marine gastropod mollusk in the family Trochidae, the top snails.

Description
The size of the shell varies between 5 mm and 7 mm. The perforate shell has a globose-conoid shape. It is brownish and white variegated. The six whorls are convex, the last subangulate toward the base. The base of the shell is planoconvex. The narrow umbilicus crenated. The aperture is subrotund. The lip is costate within. The oblique columella terminates in a thick tooth.

The subspecies Clanculus bronni ssp. fraterculus H. A. Pilsbry, 1904 (synonym: Clanculus hizenensis fraterculus Pilsbry, 1904 - original combination) is described by Pilsbry as trochiform with a flattened base. The ground color is nearly white, radially maculated with brown on the upper surface and smaller spots interposed between the others at the peripheral region. The base has paler small spots on the ribs, sometimes partially arranged in radial stripes. The 5½ or 6 whorls are convex and parted by a narrow, deep suture. The apical 1½ whorls are uniform, the next whorls irregularly dotted with pink on a pale buff-brown ground.

Distribution
This marine species occurs in the Indo-Pacific and off Japan, Singapore, Malaysia, Thailand and Australia (Northern Territory, Queensland)

References

 Dunker, W. (1859): Neue japanische Mollusken Malakozoologische Blätter 6, pp. 221–240
 Brazier, J. 1877. Continuation of the Mollusca collected during the Chevert Expedition. Proceedings of the Linnean Society of New South Wales 2: 41-53 
 Hedley, C. 1901. A revision of the types of the marine shells of the "Chevert" Expedition. Records of the Australian Museum 4: 121-130 
 Iredale, T. 1929. Queensland molluscan notes, No. 1. Memoirs of the Queensland Museum 9(3): 261-297, pls 30-31
 Wilson, B. 1993. Australian Marine Shells. Prosobranch Gastropods. Kallaroo, Western Australia : Odyssey Publishing Vol. 1 408 pp.
 Jansen, P. 1995. A review of the genus Clanculus Montfort, 1810 (Gastropoda: Trochidae) in Australia, with description of a new subspecies and the introduction of a nomen novum. Vita Marina 43(1-2): 39-62

External links
 To Encyclopedia of Life
 To GenBank (4 nucleotides; 1 proteins)
 To World Register of Marine Species
 

bronni
Gastropods described in 1860